Kurimka is a village and municipality in Svidník District in the Prešov Region of north-eastern Slovakia.

History
In historical records the village was first mentioned in 1548.

Geography
The municipality lies at an altitude of 329 metres and covers an area of 12.460 km2. It has a population of about 386 people.

Hiking trails
 European walking route E8
 Prešov – Miháľov – Kurimka – Dukla – Iwonicz-Zdrój – Rymanów-Zdrój – Puławy – Tokarnia (778 m) – Kamień (717 m) – Komańcza – Cisna – Ustrzyki Górne – Tarnica – Wołosate.

References

External links
 
 
Statistics report

Villages and municipalities in Svidník District
Šariš